Cha-3 or No. 3 (Japanese: 第二號驅潜特務艇) was a No.1-class auxiliary submarine chaser of the Imperial Japanese Navy that served during World War II.

History
She was laid down on 22 January 1942 by the Shanxi Shipbuilding Iron Works Co., Ltd. and launched on 27 October 1942. She was completed on 2 March 1943, fitted with armaments at the Maizuru Naval Arsenal, and assigned to the Kii Defense Force, Osaka Guard District, where she served as an escort and sub chaser in the waters near Japan. On 15 August 1943, she was reassigned to the Southeast Area Fleet. She survived the war and was seized by allied forces at Rabaul. She was removed from the Navy List on 3 May 1947.

References

1942 ships
No.1-class auxiliary submarine chasers
Auxiliary ships of the Imperial Japanese Navy